Published by the New Jersey Business and Industry Association, New Jersey Business magazine features editorials that spotlight businesses and covers state legislative issues affecting businesses in New Jersey.  Published since 1954, it is the longest-standing business magazine in the Garden State.

References

External links

Business magazines published in the United States
Monthly magazines published in the United States
Magazines established in 1954
Magazines published in New Jersey